The Small Enterprise and Market Service is a division of the Ministry of SMEs and Startups in South Korea. Its goal is to facilitate the development of small businesses and improve the country's traditional markets to encourage tourism. It was formed in 2014 from the merger of the Agency for Traditional Market Administration and the Small Enterprise Development Agency.

See also 
 List of markets in South Korea

References

External links 
  

Government agencies of South Korea